Marseille is a 2014 Spanish road movie film directed by  which stars María León and Goya Toledo.

Plot 
Sara, the biological mother of Claire, has been kept apart form her daughter for a while. Upon Claire's custody returning to Sara, Claire's foster mother Virginia ends up joining Claire and Sara in a trip to Marseille to look for Claire's French biological father.

Cast

Production 
The film is a Tornasol Films and Messidor Films production, with the participation of TVE and Canal+, and support from ICAA and ICEC and funding from ICO. Shooting locations included Madrid, Castilla–La Mancha, Catalonia and Marseille.

Release 
Distributed by Syldavia Cinema, the film was theatrically released in Spain on 18 July 2014.

Reception 
Jonathan Holland of The Hollywood Reporter wrote that "well-played and morally intriguing but hobbled by a half-baked script, this road movie stalls long before the end".

Jordi Costa of El País lamented that the "two core characters, with great actresses, end up suffering from the weaknesses of the project".

Mirito Torreiro of Fotogramas rated the film 3 out of 5 stars praising the "immense" casting success of child actress Noa Fontanals, while noting that the writing makes some uncalled for tricks, with the story featuring tears such as an odd criminal subplot.

Accolades 

|-
| align = "center" rowspan = "3" | 2015 || rowspan = "2" | 29th Goya Awards || Best Actress || María León ||  || rowspan = "2" | 
|-
| Best Supporting Actress || Goya Toledo || 
|-
| 24th Actors and Actresses Union Awards || Best Film Actress in a Secondary Role || Goya Toledo ||  || align = "center" | 
|}

See also 
 List of Spanish films of 2014

References 

2010s road movies
Spanish drama films
2010s Spanish-language films
Films set in Marseille
Spanish road movies
Films shot in Madrid
Films shot in Castilla–La Mancha
Films shot in Catalonia
Films shot in Marseille